Foreigner’s God is a 2019 Nollywood movie produced by Kelechi Freeman Ukadike and directed by Ifan Ifeanyi Michael under the production company of Ifan Micheal Productions. The movie stars Henry Coxe, Ini Dima-Okojie, Toni Tones, Pete Edochie, Nkem Owoh, Bambam (Oluwabamike Olawumi), Teddy A (Tope Adenibuyan, Eucharia Anunobi, Sam Dede, Toyin Abraham, Salma Mumin, and others.

Synopsis 
The film revolves around an English documentary photographer who came to Igbo land during the colonial era. The film took a new dimension when his bodyguard disappear miraculously and eventually fall in love with a sub human witch in the jungle.

Amazon Prime Video 
Though the movie was produced in 2019 but was not acquired by Amazon Prime Video until 2022.

Cast 
Henry Coxe, Ini Dima-Okojie, Toni Tones, Bambam (Oluwabamike Olawumi), Teddy A (Tope Teddy Adenibuyan), Pete Edochie, Nkem Owoh, Sam Dede, Eucharia Anunobi, Toyin Abraham, Lala Akindoju, Kunle Idowu, Sharon Ooja, Linda Osifo, Yinka Pierce-Tijani, Annie Idibia.

References 

2019 films
Nigerian drama films
English-language Nigerian films